Aidan Wilson (born 2 January 1999) is a Scottish footballer who plays as a defender for NIFL Premiership side Glentoran. He previously played for Rangers, Dumbarton, Forfar Athletic, Edinburgh City and most recently Crusaders.

Club career
Wilson joined Rangers aged seven from his local boys club Ardencaple. He signed a new contract on 9 May 2017 which tied him to the club until May 2019. Wilson made his debut for Rangers in a Scottish Premiership match against Aberdeen on 17 May 2017. Wilson agreed a further one-year extension to his Rangers contract in October 2017. He joined Scottish Championship club Dumbarton on loan in February 2018. On 3 August, Wilson joined Forfar Athletic on loan until January 2019.

After a successful trial period, Wilson signed for NIFL Premiership side Crusaders on 11 September 2020 on a two-year contract. On 7 May 2022, he came on as a substitute in the final of the 2021–22 Irish Cup which Crusaders won 2–1 after extra time.

At the end of the 2021–22 season Wilson signed for Glentoran.

International career
Wilson has represented Scotland U16 in the Victory Shield and U17 and U19 in the Euro Championship.

Career statistics

Honours
Crusaders
Irish Cup: 2021–22

References

External links

1999 births
Living people
Scottish footballers
Association football defenders
Rangers F.C. players
Scottish Professional Football League players
Scotland youth international footballers
Dumbarton F.C. players
Forfar Athletic F.C. players
F.C. Edinburgh players
Crusaders F.C. players
Glentoran F.C. players